Matthew James John Critchley (born 13 August 1996) is an English cricketer, playing for Essex County Cricket Club having signed for them from Derbyshire County Cricket Club. He made his first-class debut on 3 May 2015 in the 2015 County Championship against Glamorgan. In his second game, he became the youngest player to score a century for Derbyshire. He made his Twenty20 debut on 21 May 2016 for Derbyshire against Lancashire Lightning in the 2016 NatWest t20 Blast.

Critchley signed a two-year contract extension with Derbyshire in July 2020. In October 2021 it was announced that Critchley had joined Essex on a three-year deal for an undisclosed fee. In April 2022, he was bought by the Welsh Fire for the 2022 season of The Hundred.In 2023, Critchley played six games for the Melbourne Renegades in the 2022-23 Big Bash.

References

External links
 

1996 births
Living people
Cricketers from Preston, Lancashire
Derbyshire cricketers
English cricketers
North v South cricketers
Welsh Fire cricketers
Essex cricketers